Buzz!: Quiz TV (developed under the working title Buzz! PS3), developed by Relentless Software and Sleepydog, is the seventh game in the Buzz! series of quiz games and the first to appear on the PlayStation 3 console. It debuts new wireless Buzz! controllers, as well as new game rounds. It is the first Buzz! game to feature user created content and online play. Buzz! Quiz TV was one of the first games to support the PlayStation 3 trophy system, and the first online game to support the feature. The game is available in a game only (Solus) version or in a bundle which includes 4 of the new wireless Buzz! Buzzers, a USB dongle for wireless connectivity (each dongle can connect 4 buzzers to the PlayStation 2 or PlayStation 3).

An updated version of Quiz TV has been announced. Buzz!: Quiz TV - Special Edition will comprise the already released updates plus some of the question packs that were available via the PlayStation Store. Buzz!: Quiz TV fully supports Game Launching in PlayStation Home as of 10 September 2009.

User-generated content
Players are able to create their own quizzes via a website called "MyBuzz!"
David Amor, the creative director, in an interview with IGN stated that users would be able to freely create their own question packs which will be completely moderated by other users via user ratings, and a special "report content" button will flag inappropriate packs, as well as a parental guidance monitor to prevent free downloading by minors. Each user created question pack has eight questions, and individual packs can be linked consecutively.

This feature is no longer available. SCE and Relentless have shut down the server that handles this function. The website that users visited to create their own quizzes now redirects to the generic Buzz website.

Updates
V1.01 was released on 6 August 2008 and introduced compatibility with the PlayStation 3 Trophies system. It also allows up to four controllers to be used in Sofa vs Sofa mode meaning multiple players on the same console can share a character and all answer questions in an online match.

V1.10 update released on 9 September 2008 added four new characters, new costumes for every existing character, ten new buzzer noises and support for the PlayStation Eye.

Rounds
There are nine types of round in the game. A single-player game consists solely of three rounds of Stop The Clock, where the faster the player answers a question, the more points are awarded, provided that the answer is correct.

When playing a local multiplayer game with up to four players a game consists of seven rounds. These are:

Point Builder - Each player is awarded 250 points for each correct answer; six questions are given, allowing for a maximum of 1500 points in the first round.
Pass The Bomb or Short Fuse - One player is selected at random to be given the bomb and must then answer a question correctly to pass the bomb to the next player. The player holding the bomb when it explodes loses 300 points.
Fastest Finger - The player who answers the question the fastest receives the most points and each subsequent player who answers correctly receives less points; in a 4-player game, the first correct answer is worth 400 points, the second is worth 300, then 200 and 100 if all 4 players answer correctly.
Pie Fight - The first player to answer correctly gains control of a cream pie and must then press their buzzer as a target passes over the player they want the pie to hit. Each player can be hit twice, after which they will be knocked out of the round. The last player standing receives 1000 points in a 4-player game, 2nd gets 500, 3rd gets 250 and 4th (first player eliminated) gets nothing.
Point Stealer - The first player to answer correctly selects another player to steal points from, taking 300 from the selected opponent's score and adding it to their own.
High Stakes - A brief description of the topic the next question will be based on what is displayed on-screen. Players must then decide how many points they bet (50, 100, 250 or 500) that they will answer the question correctly.

The game ends with The Final Countdown. Here, each player is on a raised podium - the higher one's score going into this final round, the higher one's podium is at the start of the round. Once the round starts, as each question is asked, everyone's podiums start constantly moving towards the ground until an answer is selected. Once all have selected answers or run out of time, the correct answer is revealed. The fastest correct answer gains the player a boost, and incorrect answers cause the player's podium to drop sharply. When a player's podium reaches the ground, that player is out. The winner is the last player left on their podium.

A multiplayer round of more than four players follows much the same structure, except the Pie Fight and Pass The Bomb rounds are not played.

Online multiplayer games feature the Stop The Clock and High Stakes rounds in addition to All That Apply where players may select as many answers as they like out of the four options. Players gain points for each correct answer given and lose points if they select an incorrect one or miss a correct one.

Reception

IGN UK praised Quiz TV on its presentation and long lasting appeal but was unhappy with the lack of toughness in the games' questions, commenting that "most games descend into a question of fastest finger first". Despite their complaints they declared that Quiz TV'  "is still one of the most wholesome and entertaining party games available."

Reviewing Quiz TV for Eurogamer, Dan Whitehead expressed initial disappointment that the game didn't feel bigger or bolder, like other games that have jumped from one console generation to another, but went on to say that due to the quality of the Buzz! franchise the game didn't really need a makeover anyway. Whitehead thought that the game was "more of a tentative step forward than a giant leap" stating that the game would "grow into something quite wonderful" with the aid of updates and user created MyBuzz content.

Notes

References

External links
Official website
Official US website
MyBuzz! website 
Sleepydog Ltd

2008 video games
PlayStation 3-only games
EyeToy games
Party video games
Sony Interactive Entertainment games
Buzz!
Video games developed in the United Kingdom
PlayStation 3 games
Video games with user-generated gameplay content
Relentless Software games
Multiplayer and single-player video games